In basketball, points are accumulated through free throws or field goals. The National Basketball Association's (NBA) scoring title is awarded to the player with the highest points per game average in a given season. The scoring title was originally determined by total points scored through the 1968–69 season, after which points per game was used to determine the leader instead. The three-point field goal was introduced in the NBA at the start of the 1979–80 season. To qualify for the scoring title, a player must appear in at least 58 games (out of 82). However, a player who appears in fewer than 58 games may qualify as annual scoring leader if his point total would have given him the greatest average, had he appeared in 58 games. This has been the requirement since the 2013–14 season, with requirements changing several times previously throughout history.

Wilt Chamberlain holds the all-time records for total points scored (4,029) and points per game (50.4) in a season; both records were achieved in the 1961–62 season. He also holds the rookie records for points per game when he averaged 37.6 points in the 1959–60 season. Among active players, James Harden has the highest point total (2,818) and the highest scoring average (36.1) in a season; both were achieved in the 2018–19 season.

Michael Jordan has won the most scoring titles, with ten. Jordan and Chamberlain are the only players to have won seven consecutive scoring titles (this was also Chamberlain's career total). George Gervin, Allen Iverson and Kevin Durant have won four scoring titles in their career, and James Harden, George Mikan, Neil Johnston and Bob McAdoo have achieved it three times. Paul Arizin, Bob Pettit, Kareem Abdul-Jabbar, Shaquille O'Neal, Tracy McGrady, Kobe Bryant, Russell Westbrook and Stephen Curry have each won the scoring title twice. Since the 1946–47 season, five players have won both the scoring title and the NBA championship in the same season: Joe Fulks in 1947 with the Philadelphia Warriors, Mikan from 1949 to 1950 with the Minneapolis Lakers, Abdul-Jabbar (then Lew Alcindor) in 1971 with the Milwaukee Bucks, Jordan from 1991 to 1993 and from 1996 to 1998 with the Chicago Bulls, and O'Neal in 2000 with the Los Angeles Lakers. Since the introduction of the three-point field goal, O'Neal is the only scoring leader to not have made a three-pointer during the season.

At 21 years and 197 days, Durant is the youngest scoring leader in NBA history, averaging 30.1 points in the 2009–10 season. Russell Westbrook led the league with an average of 31.6 points in the 2016–17 season, when he also became the second NBA player to average a triple-double in a season. The most recent champion is Joel Embiid.

Key

Annual leaders

Multiple-time leaders

See also 

List of National Basketball Association career scoring leaders
List of National Basketball League (United States) season scoring leaders

Notes

References 
General

Specific

National Basketball Association lists
National Basketball Association statistical leaders